Rainbow Islands Revolution, known in Japan as , is a platform game for the Nintendo DS. It is an update of the original game, Rainbow Islands. Unlike in the original, the main character, Bub, rides in a bubble, and the player has to guide him with the stylus, and draw rainbows with it as well. The game uses mainly the DS's touch screen.

Gameplay
The player has to drag Bub around using the stylus. Contact with enemies or dangerous objects such as spikes causes the player to lose a heart. When all hearts have been lost, the player loses a life and must begin the level anew. 

When the player drags the stylus anywhere on the screen that isn't Bub, the player can create a rainbow. The rainbow serves as a barrier through which enemies can't cross. If the rainbow is drawn over an enemy, the enemy is killed. Additionally, when the player taps a rainbow, it falls down removing any enemies that lie below.

The player can also draw some special shapes which create rainbows with special effects.

Reception

The game received "mixed" reviews according to the review aggregation website Metacritic. In Japan, Famitsu gave it a score of two sevens and two sixes for a total of 26 out of 40.

References

External links
 

2005 video games
Bubble Bobble
Codemasters games
Marvelous Entertainment games
Nintendo DS games
Nintendo DS-only games
Platform games
Taito games
Rising Star Games games
Single-player video games
Video games developed in Japan